Chauncey Starr (April 14, 1912 – April 17, 2007) was an American electrical engineer and an expert in nuclear energy.

Born in Newark, New Jersey, Starr received an electrical engineering degree in 1932 and a Ph.D. in physics in 1935 from Rensselaer Polytechnic Institute.

Starr was vice president of Rockwell International and president of its Atomics International Division. In 1967 he became the dean of the UCLA School of Engineering and Applied Science.  Six years later he founded the Electric Power Research Institute (EPRI) and was its first president. He was the first president emeritus of EPRI.

Starr was a member of the board of directors at the George C. Marshall Institute, a member of the board of science advisors of the Science and Environmental Policy Project (SEPP) and, like most other members of that board, he signed the Leipzig Declaration on Global Climate Change.

Starr died at his home in Atherton, California, from natural causes. The day before his death he celebrated his 95th birthday at an EPRI ceremony.

Starr was elected to the National Academy of Engineering in 1965. He received in 1979 the Walter H. Zinn Award from the American Nuclear Society, and in 1990 he was awarded the National Medal of Technology by then President George H. W. Bush. He was a recipient of the Harold Pender Award in 1975.

Selected publications
 Starr, C. (1969), "Social benefit versus technological risk", Science 165 (3899), pp. 1232-1238

References

External links
Chauncey Starr profile via RPI
Chauncy Starr interview via EPRI
Chauncey Starr death notice via EPRI

American nuclear engineers
American electrical engineers
Engineers from California
Manhattan Project people
1912 births
2007 deaths
Atomics International
National Medal of Technology recipients
UCLA Henry Samueli School of Engineering and Applied Science faculty
Rensselaer Polytechnic Institute alumni
20th-century American engineers
People from Atherton, California